The Bureau of Narcotics and Dangerous Drugs (BNDD) was a bureau within the United States Department of Justice (DOJ) and a predecessor agency of the modern Drug Enforcement Administration (DEA).

History
It was created by § 3 of the Reorganization Plan No. 1 of 1968, submitted to Congress on 7 February 1968 and effective 8 April 1968. It was formed as a subsidiary of the United States Department of Justice, combining the Bureau of Narcotics (from the United States Department of the Treasury) and Bureau of Drug Abuse Control (from the United States Department of Health, Education, and Welfare's Food and Drug Administration) into one agency.

In 1973, the BNDD was merged into the newly formed Drug Enforcement Administration (DEA).

Activities
In 1971, the BNDD was composed of 1,500 agents and had a budget of some $43 million (which was more than fourteen times the size of the budget of the former Bureau of Narcotics).

In January 1971 the Central Intelligence Agency (CIA) director, Richard Helms, approved a program of "covert recruitment and security clearance support to BNDD", on request of the BNDD director, John Ingersoll. Ingersoll suspected widespread corruption among BNDD agents, and in December 1970 requested the CIA's assistance in rooting it out.

See also

 United States v. Russell: U.S. Supreme Court case involving the Bureau.
 List of United States federal law enforcement agencies

References

External links
Genealogy, DEA History.

History of drug control
Defunct federal law enforcement agencies of the United States
Drugs in the United States
Drug Enforcement Administration
Government agencies established in 1968
1973 disestablishments
Central Intelligence Agency